Nidhi Bisht (born 21 October 1985) is an Indian casting director filmmaker, lawyer and actress and writer. She is one of the earliest members of The Viral Fever.

Biography
Bisht was a student of Jamia Millia Islamia. She pursued LLB degree from there. Later she began working as an associate at Singh and Singh Associates which is an intellectual property rights law firm. She practiced law at Delhi High Court more than a year. Later she gave up her job and decided to build her career in the entertainment arena. She joined The Viral Fever in 2013. She is lone non IIT graduate in The Viral Fever.

Bisht acted in Chai Sutta Chronicles in 2013. She acted in Permanent Roommates in 2014. She acted in Umrika in 2015. She acted in Phillauri in 2017. She acted in Bisht, Please! in 2017. She acted in Bachelors. She acted in Kanika in 2018 which was a short film. She also acted in web series like TVF Tripling, ImMature and The Making of…. Her film Dream Girl was released on 13 September 2019. Nidhi also played the role of Megha Astana in the TVF original web series 'Cubicles' which was released in December 2019.

Bisht also involved in writing in Permanent Roommates (2016), PA-Gals (2017) and Bisht, Please! (2017). She also worked as director in PA-Gals. She worked as casting director of TVF Pitchers and assistant director of Permanent Roommates.

Filmography

Actress

References

External links
 

Living people
Indian casting directors
Actresses in Hindi cinema
Jamia Millia Islamia alumni
Indian film actresses
Indian lawyers
1985 births
Women casting directors